Charles Stanceu (Romanian: Charles Stanciu; January 9, 1916 – April 3, 1969) was an American professional baseball player of Romanian descent who played in 39 Major League games in 1941 and 1946 with the New York Yankees and the Philadelphia Phillies. A pitcher, he batted and threw right-handed.

Career
After growing up in Canton, Ohio, Stanceu, played minor league baseball beginning in 1934 and ending in 1949. Perhaps his best success was with the 1940 Kansas City Blues for which he went 15–8. After his major league days he pitched three seasons for Columbus.

Stanceu was member of the 1941 Yankees team who won the 1941 World Series. He appeared in 22 games for the 1941 Yankees team, which won 101 games as well as the 1941 World Series.

During World War II, Stanceu was in the US Army. He came back in 1946 to pitch some more for the 1946 Yankees as well as for the 1946 Phillies. After three games in 1946 with the Yankees, he was selected off waivers by the Phillies and pitched in 14 more games for them in that season.

After baseball
After baseball, Stanceu worked for the Monarch Rubber Company in Hartville, Ohio. He died on April 3, 1969, aged 53, of a heart attack.

His son, Timothy, was the Chief Judge of the United States Court of International Trade from 2014 to 2021.

References

Further reading

External links

1916 births
1969 deaths
American people of Romanian descent
Baseball players from Canton, Ohio
Binghamton Triplets players
Butler Indians players
Columbus Red Birds players
Kansas City Blues (baseball) players
Major League Baseball pitchers
Philadelphia Phillies players
Monessen Indians players
Newark Bears (IL) players
New York Yankees players
Waterloo Hawks (baseball) players
Wilkes-Barre Barons (baseball) players
Zanesville Greys players
United States Army personnel of World War II